Fakhrabad (also Romanized as Fakhrābād) is a city in Meshgin-e Sharqi District, Meshgin Shahr County, Ardabil province, Iran. At the 2006 census, its population was 1,282 in 334 households, when it was then a village in Qarah Su Rural District. The following census in 2011 counted 1,114 people in 357 households. The latest census in 2016 showed a population of 999 people in 364 households.

References 

Meshgin Shahr County

Cities in Ardabil Province

Towns and villages in Meshgin Shahr County

Populated places in Ardabil Province

Populated places in Meshgin Shahr County